Westergeast (Low Saxon: Westergaist) is a village in Noardeast-Fryslân in the province of Friesland, the Netherlands. It has a population of around 621 in January 2017. Before 2019, the village was part of the Kollumerland en Nieuwkruisland municipality.

History 
The village was first mentioned around 1333 as Ghaest. It is located on a slight hill (geast). The Dutch Reformed church dates from 1200. In 1807, the tower was lowered. The church was restored between 1954 and 1957. Some of the stones from the tower were reused in a little woudhuisje (forest house) next to the church. The little house was demolished in 2018.

In 1840, it was home to 263 people. There is a restored windmill north of the village, De Beintemapoldermolen. It is a polder mill built in 1870. In 1950, a pumping station made the wind mill obsolete.

Gallery

References

External links
 Westergeest.net

Noardeast-Fryslân
Populated places in Friesland